Anantha S. Babbili is Professor in the Department of Communication and Media at Texas A&M University–Corpus Christi where he served as Provost and Vice President for Academic Affairs.

Education
Babbili received a B.S. in Biological Sciences in 1971 and a B.A. in Journalism in 1972 from Osmania University in India. He earned his M.A. in Journalism from the University of Oklahoma in 1976 and his Ph.D. in Mass Communication from the University of Iowa in 1981. He also completed the Management and Leadership in Education Program at Harvard University in 2006.

Career
Babbili was a journalist in India and Asia, and was a consultant for the UN, UNESCO and several media organizations on international and intercultural communication. He has held visiting professorships in Canada, the United Kingdom, India and Slovakia.

He was a journalism professor and administrator of media studies and internationalization programs at Texas Christian University in Fort Worth for 21 years.

In 2002, he became the dean of the College of Mass Communication at Middle Tennessee State University, where he remained for five years.

He joined Texas A&M University–Corpus Christi as the Provost and Chief Academic Officer in 2007.

He is also a commentator on both television and in print, focusing on ethical issues in global affairs.  He was an invited speaker at Oxford University, London School of Economics and other institutions around Europe and Asia.

Personal
Babbili speaks five languages, English being his 5th language, and plays percussion instruments. He is married to a woman named Mary and has two daughters, Samantha and Laura, and one son, Raj.

Publications
 Babbili, A. S. (1985). International press systems in historical perspective. American Journalism, 2(2), 174–179.
 Babbili, A. S. (1986). The new world information order. In W. M. Brasch & D. R. Ulloth (Eds.), The press and the state: Sociohistorical and contemporary studies (pp. 361–374). Lanham, MD: University Press of America.
 Babbili, A. S. (1988). Surveying the landscape: Recent trends and developments in international communication studies. Mass Communications Review, 15(1), 16–23.
 Babbili, A. S. (1989). New communication technology and the developing world: A theoretical framework for policy-making. Interaction: Journal of the National Council of Development Communication, 7(1/2), 5–28. 
 Babbili, A. S. (1990). Bias against the oppressed: Law and disorder in global communications. International Third World Studies Journal and Review, 2(1), 267–278.
 Babbili, A. S. (1990). Understanding international discourse: Political realism and the non-aligned nations. Media, Culture and Society, 12(3), 309–324. 
 Babbili, A. S., & Hussain, S. (1994). United Arab Emirates. In Y. Kamalipour & H. Mowlana (Eds.), Mass media in the Middle East: A comprehensive handbook (pp. 293–308). Westport, CT: Greenwood Press.
 Babbili, A. S. (2000). The road from Poodur: A passage to America. In J. Law & L. K. Hughes (Eds.), Biographical passages: Essays in Victorian and Modernist biography—Honoring Mary M. Lago (pp. 127–179). Columbia, MO: University of Missouri Press.
 Babbili, A. S. (2001). Culture, ethics, and burdens of history: Understanding the communication ethos of India. In S. R. Melkote & S. Rao (Eds.), Critical issues in communication: Looking inward for answers—Essays in honor of K. E. Eapen (pp. 144–176). New Delhi, India: Sage.
 Babbili, A. S. (2008). Ethics and the discourse on ethics in postcolonial India. In M. K. Asante, Y. Miike, & J. Yin (Eds.), The global intercultural communication reader (pp. 297–316). New York, NY: Routledge.

References

Middle Tennessee State University faculty
Texas Christian University faculty
Osmania University alumni
Texas A&M University–Corpus Christi faculty
University of Oklahoma alumni
University of Iowa alumni
Year of birth missing (living people)
Living people
Communication theorists
Telugu people